L'Explorateur is a soft-ripened French triple cream cow's-milk cheese made in the Île-de-France region of France.

Created in the 1950s, it was named to honor the first US Satellite, Explorer.  As a triple creme, the fat content of its dry matter is about 75%.  It has a squat cylindrical shape, and has a smooth, unpressed texture.

Its name is a registered trademark of its manufacturer.

External links
Explorateur Cheese on The Food Dictionary
Explorateur and other cheeses

References

French cheeses